The Messina Brothers were five brothers who led a criminal organisation in London from the 1930s to the 1950s.

Early life
The father of the five Maltese Messina brothers was Giuseppe Messina (possibly born as Giuseppe Calabrese)  from Linguaglossa in Sicily. In late 1890 he came to Malta and worked in a brothel in the notorious Strait Street (Triq Strada Stretta) in Valletta. He married a Maltese woman from Zejtun called Virginia Debono and had two sons Salvatore (born 20 August 1898, Ħamrun) and Alfredo ( born 6 February 1901, Ħamrun) He then moved to Alexandria in Egypt in 1905 where there was a thriving Maltese community and built a chain of brothels. The other three sons Eugenio (born 1908, Alexandria, Egypt), Attillo (born 1910, Alexandria) and Carmelo (born 1915, Alexandria) were born in Egypt. All the five brothers joined their father in running brothels and prostitution. In 1932 the Egyptian authorities expelled Giuseppe and his sons. The family returned to Malta as Giuseppe had Maltese citizenship. In 1934 Eugenio the third son of Giuseppe, moved to London with his French prostitute wife Colette. She helped establish the sex trade in London. The other Messina brothers followed Eugenio and established themselves in Soho, London.

Gangsters
On arrival in UK the Messina brothers took up English names. Eugenio became Edward Marshal, Carmelo became Charles Maitland, Alfredo became Alfred Martin, Salvatore became Arthur Evans and Atillio became Raymond Maynard.  Properties were bought throughout the West End and businesses set up. They quickly became involved in their father's former trade and, during the years following the Second World War, imported women from Belgium, France and Spain. With a steady and highly profitable prostitution operation and adequate protection from members of the Metropolitan Police, the Messinas ran unchecked in the city. By the late 1940s they were operating thirty houses of prostitution on Queen Street, Bond Street and Stafford Street. The women handed over 80 per cent of their earnings to the brothers. By the 1950s the police estimated that at least 200 of London's most expensive prostitutes were Messina girls. Prosecution proved difficult as many of the women who worked for them had valid passports, making it hard to make a case for deportation of either the women or the brothers. Later they started recruiting local English girls by the age old technique of giving good looking girls a good time and possibly promises of marriage followed by being induced into prostitution. Attilio Messina reportedly stated to the press: "We Messinas are more powerful than the British Government. We do as we like in England."

Downfall
In the late 1940s, Duncan Webb, a crime reporter on the tabloid newspaper The People, began writing articles claiming that information was being leaked from Scotland Yard to Alfred Messina and on 3 September 1950 the paper published a front-page article, “Arrest These Four Men”, by Webb describing prostitution in the West End, including interviews with more than 100 prostitutes, and revealing names, dates, photographs and other information crucial to any police investigation. 
 
The activities of the Messinas soon gained the attention of Scotland Yard, which formed a special investigative task force under Superintendent Guy Mahon to engage in an aggressive campaign against them. By the end of the 1950s the Messinas had been forced to flee the country. Eugenio, Carmelo, Salvatore and Attilio left England on 19 March 1951. Alfredo Messina was arrested and charged with living off the immoral earnings of his girlfriend, Hermione Hinden, and for attempting to bribe the policeman Superintendent Guy Mahon – who arrested him. He was sent down for two years in prison on bribery and prostitution charges. Attilio Messina was sentenced to four years imprisonment after being caught attempting to illegally re-enter the country in April 1959). On his release he went to live in Italy.

Eugenio and Carmelo Messina eventually resurfaced in Belgium living in a 10-bedroom flat at Avenue Louise in Brussels. On 31 August 1955 Eugenio and Carmelo were arrested as they were closing a deal with two Belgian girls. They were taken to court on 23 June 1956 on charges of procuring women, illegal possession of firearms, possessing fake passports, entering Belgium illegally. Eugenio received a six-year sentence. Carmelo was acquitted because of lack of evidence. Conviction and imprisonment of Eugenio was partly because of testimony of detectives from Scotland Yard. The Police forces of Italy, France, Belgium and UK were involved in the investigations and evidence collection for the prosecution of the brothers. Carmelo was banned from re-entering England but he did and was arrested on 3 October 1958 for being an illegal immigrant. He was found sitting in a car in Knightsbridge. He received a six-month prison sentence. After completing his prison sentence he was deported to Italy. He went to live in Sanremo. He later married Maria Theresa Vervaere on 12 March 1970 and died the same day. Alfredo Messina died in Brentford in 1963. The remaining brother, Salvatore Messina, went into hiding and was never apprehended. Messina brothers laid the foundation for Maltese gangsters, pimps and criminals in Soho that followed.

See also
Charles Sabini (leader of the Sabini gang, which once operated in Clerkenwell).

References

Sources
Devito, Carlo (2005) Encyclopedia of International Organized Crime. New York: Facts On File, Inc. 
Morton James (6 Nov 2008) Gangland Soho, Publisher: Piatkus, 2008.  
Keith Dovkants (18 December 2002)Soho's Russian vice lords, Evening Standard.
Mark Sullivan (15 July 2015) Crock the Ripper, The Sun
Peg(30 August 2016) THE SOHO CONNECTIONS: A-Z of Who's Who, Scepticpeg, https://scepticpeg.wordpress.com/2016/08/30/the-soho-connections-a-z-of-whos-who/
STEFAN SLATER (2009 Vol 13 No.1 p 25-48) PROSTITUTES AND POPULAR HISTORY: NOTES ON THE ‘UNDERWORLD’, 1918–1939, Crime History & Societies https://chs.revues.org/689

Further reading
Briggs, John, Angus McInnes and Christopher Harrison. Crime and Punishment in England: An Introductory History. New York: St. Martin's Press, 1996. 
Humphreys, Rob and Judith Bamber. The Rough Guide to London. London: Rough Guides Ltd, 2003. 
 
 
 
Wilson, Colin. The World's Greatest True Crime. Barnes & Noble Publishing, 2004.

External links
 
 
 

Organizations established in the 1930s
1930s establishments in England
Organizations disestablished in the 1950s
1950s disestablishments in England
British people of Italian descent
British people of Maltese descent
British people of Sicilian descent
Organised crime gangs of London
Former gangs in London
Maltese criminals
20th century in London
British pimps